Gogarloch is a residential area within South Gyle, Edinburgh, Scotland. Corstorphine and Wester Broom are nearby.

Historically this area was marshland (hence 'loch' in the name) but the land was drained in the 19th century to create space for a new railway. Most of the housing is of the 1990s era.

Other lost lochs of Edinburgh include the Nor Loch and Burgh Loch on the site of the present day Meadows area.

References

See also
 Gogar, a nearby area which lent Gogarloch its name.

Former lochs
Areas of Edinburgh
Lochs of Edinburgh